Rational approximation may refer to:
 Diophantine approximation, the approximation of real numbers by rational numbers
 Padé approximation, the approximation of functions obtained by set of Padé approximants
 Any approximation represented in a form of rational function

See also 
 Dirichlet's approximation theorem
 Simple rational approximation